The Hochstollen is a mountain of the Urner Alps, located between the Klein Melchtal and the Melchtal in the canton of Obwalden. The border with the canton of Bern runs south of the summit.

The closest locality is Melchsee-Frutt on its east side.

References

External links
 Hochstollen on Hikr

Mountains of the Alps
Mountains of Obwalden
Mountains of Switzerland
Kerns, Switzerland